PP-9 Rawalpindi-III is a Constituency of Punjab Assembly.

Area
Gujjar Khan Tehsil excluding Municipal Committee Gujjar Khan and Qazian Circle Union Councils
Arazi Khas and UC Bishandote of Kallar Syedan Tehsil, of Rawalpindi District.

2018—2023: PP-8 (Rawalpindi-IV)

General elections are scheduled to be held on 25 July 2018.

2013—2018: PP-4 (Rawalpindi-IV)
General elections were held on 11 May 2013. Raja Shaukat Aziz Bhatti won this seat with 60159 votes.

All candidates receiving over 1,000 votes are listed here.

2018—2023: PP-9 (Rawalpindi-IV)

General elections are scheduled to be held on 25 July 2018. In 2018 Pakistani general election, Chaudhary Sajid Mehmood a candidate of Pakistan Tehreek-e-Insaf won PP-9 Rawalpindi IV election by taking 51,686 votes.

See also

 PP-8 Rawalpindi-II
 PP-10 Rawalpindi-IV

References

External links
 Election commission Pakistan's official website
 Awazoday.com check result
 Official Website of Government of Punjab

R